Hoseynabad-e Kashani (also Romanized as Ḩoseynābād-e Kāshānī) is a village in Behnamvasat-e Shomali Rural District, in the Central District of Varamin County, Tehran Province, Iran. At the 2006 census, its population was 425, in 103 families.

References 

Populated places in Varamin County